Alan Johnston (born 1962) is a British journalist who was kidnapped and held for 4 months in 2007.

Alan or Allan Johnston may also refer to:

Allan Johnston (politician) (1904–1974), member of the House of Commons of Canada
Allan Johnston (Australian footballer) (1906–1944), Australian rules footballer
Alan Johnston, Lord Johnston (1942–2008), Scottish Senator of the College of Justice
Allan Johnston (born 1973), Scottish professional footballer
Allan Johnston (psychiatrist), British psychiatrist
Allan Johnston (advertiser), Australian advertising creative executive
Alan Johnston (cricketer), Irish cricketer
Thomas Alan Johnston, Scottish engineer

See also
Alan Johnstone (1858–1932), British diplomat
Alan Johnson (disambiguation)
 Allen Johnson (disambiguation)